"Montero (Call Me by Your Name)" is a song by American rapper and singer Lil Nas X. First previewed in a Super Bowl LV commercial in February 2021, the song was released on March 26, 2021, through Columbia Records, as the lead single and title track from his debut studio album of the same name. It was written by Lil Nas X along with its producers, Take a Daytrip, Omer Fedi, and Roy Lenzo. and references his own personal name in the title along with the 2017 movie Call Me by Your Name (film)

The song is noted for its queer themes, including its sexually explicit homosexual lyrics, taking its name from the 2007 book Call Me by Your Name which centers on a gay romance. The camp, sexually charged music video for the song depicts Lil Nas X in a number of biblically-inspired scenes, including the artist riding a stripper pole to Hell, and giving a lap dance to Satan. The song and video were praised by some commentators for their boldly queer sensibilities, but were also the subject of backlash from a number of conservative figures in the United States who deemed the content immoral or harmful to children.

"Montero (Call Me by Your Name)" debuted at the top the Billboard Hot 100, giving Lil Nas X his second number-one hit on the chart after "Old Town Road". It was certified platinum in the United States by the RIAA on April 22, 2021. Outside of the United States, "Montero (Call Me By Your Name)" topped the charts 20 other countries including Canada, France, and the United Kingdom. The song received nominations for Record of the Year, Song of the Year and Best Music Video at the 2022 Grammy Awards.

Background
In 2019, Lil Nas X released "Old Town Road", a single that would go on to set a record for the longest-charting number-one song on the Billboard Hot 100. However, with some people dismissing his success as a one-hit wonder, Lil Nas X wanted to depart from the country trap sound of "Old Town Road" when working on his debut album; instead, he focused on rap, pop, and R&B, influenced by Drake and Nicki Minaj. Take a Daytrip, who produced the song, described the process behind creating the song as serendipitous. In early 2020, Lil Nas X asked the production duo to executively produce his debut album, and started recording ideas on his phone during COVID-19 lockdown. In a recording session, Lil Nas X came up with the lyrics "Call me when you want, call me when you need, call me in the morning", which led to producer Omer Fedi recording a guitar part, which was then done on banjo.

Originally titled "Call Me by Your Name", Lil Nas X played a snippet of the song in a Twitter video on July 9, 2020, as well as in the background of various TikTok videos, including one that was addressed to hip-hop rapper 6ix9ine. It was featured in a Logitech commercial that aired during Super Bowl LV in February 2021. On March 9, 2021, its release date was announced via Twitter, along with its cover. The single cover was created by Spanish–Croatian artist Filip Ćustić and features Lil Nas X as both Adam and God in a reinterpretation of Michelangelo's The Creation of Adam.

The song's title is taken from Lil Nas X's first name, while the subtitle is a reference to the 2017 LGBT romance-themed film of the same name. André Aciman, author of the novel from which the film was adapted, expressed that he was grateful and humbled that Lil Nas X had written a song with the same name as his novel. Lil Nas X later stated the film was one of the first queer movies he had ever seen that felt "very artsy" and made him interested in the concept of "calling somebody by your own name as lovers and trying to keep it between you two", inspiring him to write about it.

In an interview with Zane Lowe on the day before the release, he described his new-found self-confidence after being able to express himself freely in his new song. Furthermore, in the May issue of GQ Style, he described the conflict between his sexuality and his Christian upbringing, notably his father's role as a gospel singer, calling the new song and video "rebellious" because they allowed him to express himself in a way he hadn't before. On the day of the single's release, Lil Nas X shared an open letter to his 14-year-old self on Twitter, reflecting on his choice to come out at an early age and his nervousness about the song. However, he ultimately says it "will open doors for many other queer people to simply exist" and expressed his desire to let people be who they are.

Composition 
"Montero (Call Me by Your Name)" is a hip hop and electropop song with guitar and handclaps in syncopation. Billboard described the track as a "flamenco-like track with a subtle trap beat", while Consequence of Sound called it "flamenco and reggaeton dipped in pop". Slate noted the song's "dembow-style rhythm" while the chorus was compared to technopop in the style of Gary Numan. Lil Nas X's vocals in the second verse were likened to a cross between Juice Wrld and Iann Dior. The humming section following the chorus was included as a sort of mating call. A longer version of the song, dubbed "Satan's extended version", adds an extra half-minute and features an additional iteration of the chorus as well as a longer outro.

The song is played alla breve at 90 beats per minute and was originally published in G minor, with a vocal range from G3 to G5. Like previous songs by production duo Take a Daytrip, "Montero (Call Me by Your Name)" is in the Phrygian mode and was described as having a "Middle Eastern or Moorish or Spanish sound". Its chord progression, D–E–E–D, goes up and down a minor second, which was intended to create and release tension. Guitarist Omer Fedi plays the banjo on a harmonic minor scale, which was later processed with reverb and Auto-Tune.

The song, like many of Lil Nas X's past projects, features queer themes. Renting out an Airbnb at the start of the COVID-19 pandemic to work on his debut album, Lil Nas X revealed that it was written about a man he met in mid-2020, who was partying and taking drugs while in quarantine. In its lyrics, Lil Nas X tells his lover he no longer wants to be on the down-low. He features the line "shoot a child in yo' mouth while I'm ridin', which was intended to help break the stigma around references to gay sexual practices in music. Lil Nas X revealed he was afraid of turning away straight fans with an explicit lyric about gay sex, but decided "if they feel offended, they were never really here for me." The lyrics also discuss the pressure Lil Nas X feels in representing the LGBT community ("A sign of the times every time that I speak") and include a reference to the 19 weeks his single "Old Town Road" spent atop the Billboard Hot 100 ("A dime and a nine / It was mine every week").

Release and promotion 
The original track and music video were released on March 26, 2021, with an extended version released on March 29. In addition, Lil Nas X released a number of follow-up videos via his YouTube channel, including a muffled version (titled "MONTERO but ur in the bathroom of hell while lil nas is giving satan a lap dance in the other room") on March 28, an instrumental version (subtitled "But Lil Nas X Is Silent The Entire Time") on March 31, a behind-the-scenes look behind the song's recording process (subtitled "Official Video except its not the official video at all") on April 5, and a lo-fi version (subtitled "but it's lofi and something you can study to lol") on April 9. The lo-fi version was produced by L. Dre and Zeuz Makes Music, and was previously uploaded to the latter's YouTube channel a few days earlier. On April 23, he released an a cappella version along with an accompanying music video in the style of The Brady Bunch.

Following the song's release, he launched a promotion on Twitter where he gave out $100,000 worth of Bitcoin. He also offered $10,000 through a pole dancing challenge on the social media platform TikTok, with the hashtag #PoleDanceToHell. Another promotional tool was a collaboration with augmented reality mobile app Jadu, in which users can interact with a volumetric video-generated Lil Nas X wearing red angel wings. In addition, a free browser game titled Twerk Hero was released, in which the player controls a virtual Lil Nas X twerking to "Montero (Call Me by Your Name)". Developed by Roni Games using the Unreal Engine, the rhythm game has four levels, each accompanying a scene from the song's music video, and was noted for its jiggle physics. Lil Nas X also unveiled several T-shirts in collaboration with Pizzaslime.

On April 13, it was reported that the song was briefly removed from streaming services for unknown reasons, after Lil Nas X had asked his fans to stream the song "because it may no longer be available tomorrow". Columbia Records released a statement that the situation was "out of their control", but did not elaborate. However, later the same day, Billboard reported that the song was not being removed from streaming services, though no further explanation was offered.

Satan Shoes 

Tying into the music video's theme, Lil Nas X collaborated with art collective MSCHF Product Studio to create 666 individually numbered pairs of Nike Air Max 97 "Satan Shoes" adorned with pentagrams, inverted crosses, and the Bible verse Luke 10:18. They also contain  of ink mixed with one drop of blood from a member of the MSCHF team in the sole, which was collected over the course of a week. The shoes, which were priced at $1,018 per pair and sold out in under a minute, were compared to comic books by rock band Kiss and Marvel Comics that were printed using the band members' blood. Nike, Inc. was not involved with the design or release of the shoes, and later filed a lawsuit against MSCHF for trademark infringement and dilution. In defense, MSCHF claimed that the shoes were meant to be a form of art for display and not to actually be worn. A U.S. District Court in New York approved of a temporary restraining order against MSCHF, thereby preventing further sales of the shoes, though they were already shipped to their buyers. The lawsuit was eventually settled, with MSCHF issuing a voluntary product recall and buying back any Satan Shoes at their original price.

Live performances 
Lil Nas X performed the song as the musical guest on the last episode of season 46 of Saturday Night Live. Airing May 22, 2021, and hosted by actress Anya Taylor-Joy, the episode also featured the performance of his newest song "Sun Goes Down". During the performance of "Montero (Call Me by Your Name)", a wardrobe malfunction occurred, splitting the seam of his trousers when he squatted during a pole dance routine, leaving him unable to perform it as planned. Lil Nas X also performed the song at the 2021 BET Awards on June 27, 2021. The ancient Egypt-themed performance was a tribute to the visuals of "Remember the Time" by Michael Jackson and ended with the singer kissing a male backup dancer. Billboard ranked the performance number-one out of the sixteen in the ceremony, noting it was "the highlight of the night". Madonna compared the performance with her 2003 MTV Video Music Awards performance, when she kissed Christina Aguilera and Britney Spears on stage while performing "Hollywood", by sharing the photos of both kisses one above the other on her Instagram stories and captioning it with "#DidItFirst". Fans immediately perceived the post as an insult and began to call the singer out; however, Lil Nas X dismissed the post as a joke and stated he's friends with Madonna.

Music video

Production 

The music video for "Montero (Call Me by Your Name)" was directed by Ukrainian music video director Tanu Muino and Lil Nas X and was released along with the single. Shot over two days in February 2021, it features Lil Nas X as various characters in biblical and mythology-inspired scenes. While in Los Angeles, Muino expressed her interest in working with Lil Nas X to Columbia Records; the label contacted her in late January 2021 while she was working on the music video for Cardi B's "Up". She spent two weeks on pre-production with her collaborators before shooting with Lil Nas X. Muino drew inspiration from Dante's Inferno and paintings by Hieronymus Bosch, including The Garden of Earthly Delights—a triptych depicting heavenly and hellish imagery and the Last Judgment. It was Muino's first video as co-director, part of which was done remotely via Zoom after she had falsely tested positive for COVID-19. Anthony H. Nguyen was responsible for the make-up in the video while the hairstyling was done by Evanie Frausto. Visual effects for the music video were done by Mathematic, a French animation studio based in Paris, in a process that took seven weeks. They opted for a video game-inspired look in order to spread a "message of tolerance".

In an interview with Time, Lil Nas X revealed that inspiration for the video came from the animated television series SpongeBob SquarePants and the film Call Me by Your Name. He also discussed the music video for "Cellophane" by FKA Twigs as an influence, stating, "I wanted to see some things people have done in music videos with the pole—and I felt like Twigs did a really amazing job at that... I wanted to do my own take on it." Vulture reported that this was an homage to honor Twigs following her loss to Lil Nas X in the Grammy Award for Best Music Video category. However, "Cellophane" director Andrew Thomas Huang posted a comparison of the two videos' visual similarities on Instagram, explaining that Lil Nas X's label had contacted him prior to the recording of the video to possibly direct it and had instead hired the same choreographer. He further elaborated, "When someone who is commercially successful makes work that lives so similarly next to ours and profits from it on such a massive scale, then I felt like I had to speak up", but said he blamed record labels rather than Lil Nas X. FKA Twigs and Lil Nas X later had a conversation regarding the comparison and praised each other's videos on Instagram.

Synopsis 

Following a voice-over introduction where Lil Nas X discusses not having to hide in shame, the music video begins with the singer portraying both Adam and the serpent in the Garden of Eden. The serpent seduces Adam using its third eye, and the two kiss. The next scene features Lil Nas X in chains at the Colosseum as he is judged by versions of himself in Marie Antoinette wigs and stoned by spectators. After he is killed by a thrown butt plug, he starts to ascend toward an angelic figure in Heaven before grabbing onto a pole, which sends him down to Hell as he pole dances. He makes his way over to Satan and proceeds to give him a lap dance wearing Calvin Klein underwear and thigh-high boots with stiletto heels. After snapping Satan's neck, Lil Nas X crowns himself with the horns as his eyes glow and wings emerge.

In addition to its biblical references and symbolism, the music video features a running theme of duality, including good vs. evil and masculinity vs. femininity. A Greek quotation from Plato's Symposium is shown on the tree of life: "After the division the two parts of man, each desiring his other half". The scene in the Colosseum was seen as a reference to the trial of Jesus before Pontius Pilate, while the judges' costumes were inspired by the all-denim outfits worn by Britney Spears and Justin Timberlake in 2001. The Latin phrase "" is written on the ground below Satan, which translates to "they condemn what they do not understand". According to a press release accompanying the video, the final scene represents "dismantling the throne of judgement and punishment that has kept many of us from embracing our true selves out of fear."

An analysis of the music video's symbolism by historians compared the snake figure to Lilith from Jewish mythology, who has often been depicted as a serpentine demon. The stoning scene saw Lil Nas X represented as a Christian martyr and the angelic figure was seen to represent Ganymede from Greek mythology, who is widely regarded as a symbol of homosexuality. The video also drew comparisons with the character HIM from the animated series The Powerpuff Girls, for portraying the devil as a "queer-coded" entity or a "red, gay man", a trope that became prominent in cartoons from the 1990s. Rebecca Long wrote for Observer: "Intentionally or not, Lil Nas X draws on this history in 'Montero', reclaiming the motif and continuing a long tradition of queer blasphemy".

Reception and controversy 

The song and music video received praise from several outlets for being "unabashedly queer". Variety Adam B. Vary wrote that the video "changed everything for queer music artists", noting that some LGBT artists like Jonathan Knight of New Kids on the Block and Lance Bass of NSYNC sang about women while staying closeted, while others like Elton John and Ricky Martin did not explicitly sing about their sexuality. He described the sexual imagery, including the pole dance, as evoking images of Madonna or Janet Jackson, without the need to hide his homosexuality. He also remarked that artists like Frank Ocean and Troye Sivan were bolder about their sexuality, but had never reached the same level of commercial success as Lil Nas X. David Harris, a magister of the Church of Satan, approved of the music video's portrayal of consensual sexuality as well as the ending of Lil Nas X crowning himself Satan.

The music video received criticism from conservative commentators in the United States, some of whom deemed it immoral or harmful to children. Governor of South Dakota Kristi Noem, conservative pundit Candace Owens, and evangelical pastor Mark Burns all reacted negatively on Twitter, as did rapper Joyner Lucas and athletes Nick Young and Trevor Lawrence. In response to criticism, Lil Nas X wrote on Twitter: "There is a mass shooting every week that our government does nothing to stop. Me sliding down a CGI pole isn't what's destroying society" and "I am an adult. I am not gonna spend my entire career trying to cater to your children. That is your job", among other retorts. However, he also confessed that the backlash was "putting an emotional toll" on him.

The negative reception to the song and music video was characterized by Los Angeles Times and Vice as illustrating a Satanic panic and compared to past moments in popular music history, including jazz music being referred to as "the devil's music" in the early 20th century, John Lennon's comment in a 1966 interview that the Beatles were "more popular than Jesus", backmasking accusations, the Parents Music Resource Center's "Filthy Fifteen", Madonna's music video for "Like a Prayer", Lady Gaga's music videos for "Judas" and "Alejandro", and Nicki Minaj's performance of "Roman Holiday" at the 54th Annual Grammy Awards. Esquire referred to it as "beelzepop" and similarly compared reception to Gaga's "Judas" and Minaj's "Roman Holiday".

The controversy has been described as being part of the marketing strategy for the song. Neena Rouhani of Billboard depicted the social media outrage as his "greatest marketing tool", and Kevin Meenan, a music charts manager at YouTube, described it as "very explicit", and that controversy was his goal. Jon Caramanica of The New York Times compared the controversy to bait, and a performance of moral panic, noting how he uses Twitter as a "performance space ... with an almost limitless audience".

The visuals of the music video became popular on social media, with the pole dance becoming a meme on TikTok. Additionally, the music video and its reception were lampooned on a Saturday Night Live cold open, with Chris Redd as Lil Nas X discussing the controversy with Chloe Fineman as Britney Spears. In June 2021, a  mural depicting three of Lil Nas X's looks in the music video was put up in Philadelphia's Gayborhood.

Rankings

Accolades

Commercial performance 
"Montero (Call Me by Your Name)" debuted at the top of the Billboard Hot 100 for the week of April 10, 2021, with 21,000 downloads, 46.9 million streams, and 1.1 million radio airplay audience impressions. It also debuted at number one on Billboard Streaming Songs chart and the US Rolling Stone Top 100, and at number two on the Billboard Digital Song Sales chart. The song reached number one on the latter chart during its third week, selling 19,500 downloads and rising from number 3 to become his second leader after his 2019 hit "Old Town Road" solo or featuring Billy Ray Cyrus.

In the United Kingdom, "Montero (Call Me by Your Name)" was the most-streamed song during its week of release, with 6.8 million plays (including 2.5 million video streams), and debuted at the top of the UK Singles Chart on April 2, 2021 – for the week ending date April 8, 2021 – becoming Lil Nas X's second number one song in Britain following "Old Town Road" in April 2019. The song sold 62,000 copies and was streamed 8.6 million times in its second week at the top. The song spent five weeks atop the chart.

In Ireland, the song also debuted at the top of the Irish Singles Chart on April 2, 2021 – for the week ending date April 8, 2021 – becoming Lil Nas X's second number one song in the Irish Republic following "Old Town Road" in April 2019. The following week, it stayed atop the chart and was the most-streamed song in the country that week.

In Australia, the song debuted at number 16 on the ARIA Singles Chart as the highest debut of the week and soared to number 3 the following week becoming his second top ten hit on the chart. The song later reached its peak of number 1.

Track listing
Original version
"Montero (Call Me by Your Name)" – 2:17
Extended version
"Montero (Call Me by Your Name)" – 2:17
"Montero (Call Me by Your Name)" (Satan's extended version) – 2:50

Instrumental version
"Montero (Call Me by Your Name)" – 2:17
"Montero (Call Me by Your Name)" (Satan's extended version) – 2:50
"Montero (Call Me by Your Name)" (But Lil Nas X is silent the entire time) – 2:48
EP version
"Montero (Call Me by Your Name)" – 2:17
"Montero (Call Me by Your Name)" (But Lil Nas X makes all the sounds with his mouth) – 2:20
"Montero (Call Me by Your Name)" (Satan's extended version) – 2:50
"Montero (Call Me by Your Name)" (But Lil Nas X is silent the entire time) – 2:48

Credits and personnel
Credits adapted from Jaxsta via Billboard.
 Lil Nas X songwriter, vocals
 Take a Daytrip producer
 Denzel Baptiste songwriter, recording engineer, background vocals
 David Biral songwriter, background vocals
 Omer Fedi songwriter, producer, guitar
 Roy Lenzo songwriter, producer, recording engineer
 Şerban Ghenea mixing engineer
Chris Gehringer mastering engineer

Charts

Weekly charts

Year-end charts

Certifications

Release history

See also 

 List of most-streamed songs on Spotify
 List of Billboard Global 200 number ones of 2021
 List of number-one singles of 2021 (Australia)
 List of number-one urban singles of 2021 (Australia)
 List of top 10 singles for 2021 in Australia
 List of number-one hits of 2021 (Austria)
 List of Canadian Hot 100 number-one singles of 2021
 List of number-one digital songs of 2021 (Canada)
 List of number-one singles of 2021 (Finland)
 List of number-one hits of 2021 (France)
 List of top 10 singles in 2021 (France)
 List of number-one singles of 2021 (Ireland)
 List of top 10 singles in 2021 (Ireland)
 List of number-one songs in Norway
 List of number-one singles of 2021 (Portugal)
 List of number-one songs in 2021 (Turkey)
 List of UK Singles Chart number ones of the 2020s
 List of UK top-ten singles in 2021
 List of Official Audio Streaming Chart number ones of the 2020s
 List of Billboard Digital Song Sales number ones of 2021
 List of Billboard Hot 100 number-one singles of the 2020s
 List of Billboard Hot 100 number ones of 2021
 List of Billboard Hot 100 top-ten singles in 2021
 List of Billboard Streaming Songs number ones of 2021
 List of Rolling Stone Top 100 number-one songs of 2021

References

External links 
 
 "Montero (Call Me by Your Name)" music video portfolio at Behance

2020 songs
2021 controversies in the United States
2021 singles
Billboard Hot 100 number-one singles
Canadian Hot 100 number-one singles
Columbia Records singles
Cultural depictions of Adam and Eve
Cultural depictions of the Devil
Electropop songs
Irish Singles Chart number-one singles
LGBT-related songs
LGBT-related controversies in music
Lil Nas X songs
Music video controversies
Number-one singles in Australia
Number-one singles in Austria
Number-one singles in Finland
Number-one singles in France
Number-one singles in Greece
Number-one singles in Israel
Number-one singles in Norway
Number-one singles in Portugal
Number-one singles in Russia
Obscenity controversies in music
Religious controversies in music
Satanic ritual abuse hysteria in the United States
Snakes in popular culture
Songs written by Lil Nas X
UK Singles Chart number-one singles
Songs written by Omer Fedi
Music videos directed by Tanu Muino
Billboard Global 200 number-one singles
Billboard Global Excl. U.S. number-one singles
MTV Video Music Award for Best Direction
MTV Video of the Year Award